Witold Zakrzewski (1903–1987) was a Polish sailing activist. A graduate of the Sea School in Tczew. Served the Polish Navy. Zakrzewski was a co-founder of the Yacht Club of Poland (Yacht Klub Polski) and a chairman of the Polish Yachting Association (Polski Związek Żeglarski; 1949–1951).

References

External links
 History of the Yacht Club of Poland

1903 births
1987 deaths
Polish Navy personnel
Polish sailors